The World of Suzie Wong is a 1958-premiered stage play, adapted from the eponymous 1957 novel by Richard Mason, The World of Suzie Wong. The play was in turn adapted into the 1960 Hollywood British-American feature film The World of Suzie Wong. The novel was adapted into a play by playwright Paul Osborn. It is one of the major elements of the Suzie Wong franchise.

Plot
The play dramatizes the story of the eponymous Richard Mason novel, The World of Suzie Wong, upon which it is based.

History
The play opened for the 1958-1959 Broadway season in New York City on October 14, 1958. It opened at the Broadhurst Theatre for the 1958–1959 season, and went on to the 54th Street Theatre for the 1959–1960 season. It closed its first Broadway run on January 2, 1960. The Broadway run was directed by Joshua Logan, with sets designed by Jo Mielziner, and costumes designed by Dorothy Jeakins; and starring France Nuyen as Suzie Wong, and William Shatner as Robert Lomax. During its first shows, the play was constantly improved from being a turgid drama to having a more comedic tone, evolving from a play that was panned to an award-winning play. At the time she was cast, France Nuyen spoke little English and learned her lines phonetically. Mary Mon Toy also gained notability through her role s Minnie Ho in the Broadway production.

The play opened for the 1959-1960 West End season in London. The West End run starred Tsai Chin as Suzie Wong. Peter Coe later signed on as director.

Film adaptation

The play was adapted into an eponymous motion picture feature film, The World of Suzie Wong, that premiered in 1960. France Nuyen, who played Suzie Wong on Broadway, would go on to be cast for the film adaptation, but fell ill during filming, and needed to be replaced by Nancy Kwan. In lieu of William Shatner, the film cast an older male lead, William Holden, which changed the dynamic between the male and female leads.

Awards and honours
 Winner: 1959 Theatre World Award — France Nuyen as Suzie Wong
 Winner: 1959 Theatre World Award — William Shatner as Robert Lomax 
 Nominee: 1959 Tony Awards Best Costume Design (Play or Musical) — Dorothy Jeakins

References

1958 plays
Plays set in the 1950s
Plays about race and ethnicity
Hong Kong in fiction
Broadway plays
Melodramas
Plays set in China
Plays based on novels
Plays about prostitution
American plays adapted into films
West End plays

Works about prostitution in Hong Kong